Nucleus is the second full-length studio album by Swedish progressive rock band Anekdoten. The album was released in 1995.

Track listing
 "Nucleus" – 5:09
 "Harvest" – 6:50
 "Book of Hours" – 9:57a) Pendulum Swing / b) The Book
 "Raft/Rubankh" – 4:06
 "Here" – 7:24
 "This Far from the Sky" – 8:37
 "In Freedom" – 6:24
 "Luna Surface" – 8:56 (bonus track on the 2004 reissue)

Personnel
 Peter Nordins – percussion
 Jan Erik Liljeström – bass, vocals
 Nicklas Berg – guitar, hand organ, vocals, clavinet, mellotron, Fender Rhodes
 Anna Sofi Dahlberg – cello, vocals, mellotron

Additional personnel
 Helena Källander – violin
 Tommy Andersson – Fender Rhodes on track 2

References

External links 
 

Anekdoten albums
1995 albums